Universal Prayer may refer to

 The Universal Prayer, a poem by Alexander Pope
 Universal Prayer (song), a song by Jamelia and Tiziano Ferro